MMCC may refer to:
 Margaret Morrison Carnegie College
 Mid Michigan Community College
 Multinational Medical Coordination Centre, to coordinate e
 Mountfitchet Maths and Computing College, a former school in Stansted Mountfitchet, now Forest Hall School
 Mobile Multi-Coloured Composite, 2D colour barcode
 2200 in Roman numerals